Mae Lan may refer to:

Mae Lan District
Mae Lan, Pattani
Mae Lan, Lamphun